The 1948 United States presidential election in Tennessee took place on November 2, 1948, as part of the 1948 United States presidential election. Tennessee voters chose 12 representatives, or electors, to the Electoral College, who voted for president and vice president.

Tennessee was won by incumbent President Harry S. Truman (D–Missouri), running with Senator Alben W. Barkley, with 49.14% of the popular vote, against Governor Thomas Dewey (R–New York), running with Governor Earl Warren, with 36.87% of the popular vote. Truman received eleven of Tennessee's twelve electoral votes, the other was cast in favor of Strom Thurmond by a faithless elector. , this is the last election in which Hamilton County voted for a Democratic Presidential candidate.

Results

Results by county

Notes

References

North Carolina
1948
1948 Tennessee elections